Gateway Regional School District is a school district serving students from eight surrounding towns in Massachusetts including Huntington, Russell, Blandford, Chester, Montgomery, Middlefield, and Worthington.

The district consists of two elementary schools, a middle school, and a high school providing educational services to approximately 1,000 students in grades PreK–12.

Schools 
Gateway Regional's system includes:
Gateway Regional High School
Gateway Regional Middle School
Littleville Elementary
Chester Elementary
Blandford Elementary (closed)
R. H. Conwell Elementary (closed)
Russell Elementary (closed)

At one time, the Gateway district operated five elementary schools. Due to declining student numbers and reduced state revenue, the school committee voted to consolidate elementary schools (thereby closing Blandford Elementary School, R. H. Conwell Elementary School, and Russell Elementary School). Students that normally would have attended those schools now go to Littleville Elementary School in Huntington, or Chester Elementary School in Chester.  R. H. Conwell re-opened under the name of R. H. Conwell Community Education Center for the 2010–2011 school year and is now run as a private school by residents of the town of Worthington.

Administration

District
Dr. David Hopson - Superintendent  	
Stephanie Fisk - Business Manager

Administration
Jason Finnie - High School Principal, Middle School Principal 
Martha Clark - High School Assistant Principal 	  	
Megan Coborn - Elementary/Middle School Principal
Darlene Rehor - Elementary/Middle Assistant Principal
Kurt Garivaltis - Director of Pupil Services
   Deanna LeBlanc   - Curriculum Director
   Wendy Long   - Grantwriter/Community Relations Specialist

History 

In 1949, the concept of a regional high school was presented to the townspeople by Superintendent, Dana O. Webber as a solution to the educational facilities problem in this valley. The idea was voted down at that time but was presented again in 1950-1951. Many meetings were held in the towns involved, and a brochure suggesting curriculum and cost was presented to the townspeople. But in 1952 the issue was once more turned down by the voters. It was not until 1955 that the matter was reconsidered. The committee spent more than a year trying to arrive at a solution best suited to the four towns, and in May 1957, Huntington and Montgomery voted in favor of accepting; Blandford had a tie vote; and Chester defeated the issue. In July of the same year, the towns of Huntington and Montgomery voted to form a two-town district, the nucleus of the eventual Gateway Regional School District. Worthington and Chester were admitted by amendment in 1959, but Chester withdrew in 1960.

At town meetings in 1961, initial funds were appropriated for capital outlay, and an option to purchase the present school site was taken. The architects and contractors were chosen, and ground-breaking ceremonies were held on June 28, 1962. Superintendent Dana O. Webber was elected Superintendent by the committee at its inception.. Mrs. Stella Belisle was elected clerk of the committee in 1961.

In the fall of 1962, the town of Middlefield requested an amendment for its admittance to the district, and in November that town was admitted. The new school began its official school year on Wednesday, September 4, 1963, with an enrollment of 240 Students.

External links 
Gateway Regional School District

Education in Hampden County, Massachusetts
Education in Hampshire County, Massachusetts
School districts in Massachusetts
School districts established in 1957